The discography of CSS, a Brazilian electronic rock group formed in São Paulo in 2003, consists of four studio albums, 12 singles and four extended plays.

Studio albums

EPs

Singles

Remixes
Tiny Masters of Today – "Hey Mr. DJ" (2007)
Bitchee Bitchee Ya Ya Ya – "Fuck Friend" (2007)
Lily Allen – "Alfie" (2007)
The Wombats – "Kill the Director" (2007)
The Mules – "We're Good People" (2007)
The Little Ones – "Lovers Who Uncover" (2007)
Bonde Do Role – "Office Boy" (2007)
The Cribs – "Men's Needs" (2007)
Loney, Dear – "The City, the Airport" (2007)
Asobi Seksu – "Strawberries" (2007)
Kylie Minogue – "Wow" (2008)
Tetine – "I Go to the Doctor!" (2008)
The B-52's – "Funplex" (2008)
Digitalism – "Pogo" (2008)
Bloc Party – "Mercury" (2008)
Lykke Li – "Little Bit" (2008)
Keane – "The Lovers Are Losing" (2008)
Sia – "Buttons" (2008)
Tilly and the Wall – "The Freest Man" (?)
Blondie – "One Way or Another" (2005)
The Breeders – "Cannonball" (2008)
L7 – "Pretend We're Dead" (?)
Fever Ray – "Seven" (2009)

Contributions
Grizzly Bear – Knife (2007)

References

External links
CSS on VYou!

Cansei de Ser Sexy 

Discographies of Brazilian artists
Punk rock group discographies